Wandin North is a town in Victoria, Australia, 40 km east from Melbourne's central business district, located within the Shire of Yarra Ranges local government area.

History
The Post Office opened around 1909. An earlier office (1884) named Wandin North was renamed Seville.
There are two operational schools in Wandin North and the original of these schools is Wandin Yallock Primary School which was established in 1870. It is nestled amongst orchards and general farming land in the picturesque Yarra Valley. 
The Wandin North Primary School opened in 1915 and in 2016 had 240 students.

Railway 
Wandin North used to have a railway station simply called Wandin on the Warburton branch line which opened in 1901 and closed in 1965.

The town today
Wandin North contains a number of attractions such as Warratina Lavender Farm, Native plant Garden, Mont De Lancey, Wild Cattle Creek Winery and the numerous fruit orchards the best being Lanidale the Cherrywell. Wandin North is the home of a vibrant shopping precinct with many different food options and a wonderful centre garden.

Notable Local Businesses: 
IGA, Wandin Pizza Bar, Wandin Valley Providore Continental Deli, Yarra Valley Quilt Yarn & Sew,
Wandin Florist, Lanidale the Cherrywell, Cherryhill, Cherry Haven, Cherry Brothers, Maggies Seasonal Produce, Wandin Bakery, Wandin News Agency.

References

Yarra Valley
Yarra Ranges